Roderick World Harris (born November 14, 1966) was an American football wide receiver in the National Football League (NFL) for the New Orleans Saints, the Dallas Cowboys, and the Philadelphia Eagles.  He also played seven seasons in the Canadian Football League (CFL). He played college football at Texas A&M University.

1966 births
Living people
American football wide receivers
BC Lions players
Canadian football wide receivers
Dallas Cowboys players
New Orleans Saints players
Philadelphia Eagles players
Players of American football from Dallas
Players of Canadian football from Dallas
Sacramento Gold Miners players
Saskatchewan Roughriders players
Shreveport Pirates players
Texas A&M Aggies football players